2009–10 Louisville Cardinals basketball team may refer to:

2009–10 Louisville Cardinals men's basketball team
2009–10 Louisville Cardinals women's basketball team